Association Sportive Bordj Ghédir, known as AS Bordj Ghédir or simply ASBG for short, is an Algerian football club located in Bordj Ghédir in Bordj Bou Arréridj Province. The club was founded in 1957 and its colours are black and white. Their home stadium, Stade Echahid Belhaddad, has a capacity of 5,000 spectators. The club is currently playing in the Inter-Régions Division.

References

Football clubs in Algeria
Association football clubs established in 1957
1957 establishments in Algeria
Sports clubs in Algeria